The Hunger is a 1983 erotic horror film directed by Tony Scott, starring Catherine Deneuve, David Bowie, and Susan Sarandon. An international co-production of the United Kingdom and United States, the film is a loose adaptation of the 1981 novel of the same name by Whitley Strieber, with a screenplay by Ivan Davis and Michael Thomas. Its plot concerns a love triangle between a doctor who specializes in sleep and aging research (Sarandon) and a vampire couple (Deneuve and Bowie). The film's special effects were handled by make-up effects artist Dick Smith.

After premiering at the 1983 Cannes Film Festival, The Hunger was released in the spring of 1983 by Metro-Goldwyn-Mayer. Though it received a mixed critical response, the film has accrued a cult following within the goth subculture in the years since its release.

Plot 
Miriam Blaylock is a vampire, seen in flashbacks drinking from victims in Ancient Egypt, promising specially chosen humans eternal life as her vampire lovers. Her current companion is John, a talented cellist whom she met in 18th-century France. In a nightclub in New York City, they connect with a young couple whom they bring home and feed upon by slashing their throats with bladed ankh pendants. The victims' bodies are disposed of in an incinerator in the basement of Miriam and John's elegant New York townhouse, where they pose as a wealthy couple who teach classical music.

Now, 200 years after he was turned, John begins suffering insomnia and ages years in only a few days. John realizes Miriam's promise, that periodically killing and feeding upon human victims would give him immortality, was only partially true; he will have eternal life, but not eternal youth. He seeks Dr. Sarah Roberts, a research gerontologist who, with her colleagues Charlie and Tom (also Sarah's boyfriend), are studying the effects of rapid aging in primates, hoping she can reverse his accelerating decrepitude. Sarah assumes that John is a hypochondriac or mentally unbalanced and ignores his pleas for help. As the angered John leaves the clinic, Sarah is horrified to see how rapidly he is aging and offers her help, but John rebuffs her.

One of the Blaylocks' students, Alice Cavender, drops by their townhouse to say that she cannot attend the next day's lesson. In a last attempt to regain his youth, John murders and feeds upon Alice, whom Miriam was grooming to be her next consort when she came of age. However, her blood does nothing to restore him, so John begs Miriam to kill him and release him from the agony of his decrepit body. Weeping, Miriam tells him there is no release. After John collapses in the basement, Miriam carries him into the attic, which is filled with coffins and places him in one. Like John, Miriam's former vampire lovers suffer an eternal living death, helplessly moaning and trapped in their coffins. Sarah comes looking for John at his home, and Miriam claims that her husband is in Switzerland. Sarah asks to be updated on John's condition. Later, a police official comes to the residence, looking for the missing Alice. Miriam feigns ignorance.

Sarah returns to Miriam's home to again inquire about John. Miriam, who feels alone after losing both John and Alice, initiates a sexual encounter with Sarah, during which Miriam bites her arm and some of Miriam's blood enters Sarah's body. Miriam attempts to initiate Sarah in the necessities of life as a vampire, but Sarah is repulsed by the thought of subsisting on human blood.

Sarah returns home and goes out to dinner with Tom, who becomes argumentative when she rejects food and is not forthcoming about her three-and-a half-hour disappearance to the Blaylock residence. The next day at the lab, the team investigates Sarah's blood and reveal she has some kind of infection, in the form of a foreign and inhuman type of blood, that is taking over her own. Confused, Sarah returns to confront Miriam. Still reeling from the effects of her vampiric transformation, Sarah allows Miriam to put her to bed in a guest room.

Tom arrives at Miriam's home, looking for Sarah. Miriam shows him to the upstairs bedroom, where Sarah, starving and desperate, kills him. Miriam assures her that she will soon forget what she was. As the two kiss, Sarah drives Miriam's ankh knife into her own throat and holds her mouth over Miriam's, forcing Miriam to ingest her blood. Miriam carries Sarah upstairs, intending to place her with her other boxed lovers. A rumbling occurs and the mummies of Miriam's previous lovers, including John, emerge from their coffins, driving her over the edge of the balcony. As she rapidly ages, the mummies become dust.

The police investigator returns to find a real estate agent showing the townhouse to prospective buyers. Sarah is now in London with two new companions, standing on the balcony of a flat in the Barbican Estate's Cromwell Tower, admiring the view as dusk falls. From a draped coffin in a storage room, Miriam continually cries Sarah's name.

Cast 

 Catherine Deneuve as Miriam Blaylock 
 David Bowie as John Blaylock 
 Susan Sarandon as Sarah Roberts
 Cliff De Young as Tom Haver
 Dan Hedaya as Lieutenant Allegrezza
 Beth Ehlers as Alice Cavender
 Rufus Collins as Charlie Humphries

Willem Dafoe and John Pankow have brief appearances as two youths harassing Sarah at a phone booth. John Stephen Hill and Ann Magnuson play a wild young couple whom Miriam and John pick up at a nightclub to consume at the start of the film. James Aubrey plays a man whom Miriam brings to Sarah as her potential first victim.

English gothic rock band Bauhaus appear during the film's opening credits as a group performing at the nightclub, with Peter Murphy onscreen, where they play their single "Bela Lugosi's Dead." Silent film star Bessie Love makes her final film appearance as an elderly fan at Sarah's book signing.

Production 
The final scene of Sarah on the balcony was added at the studio's behest, with a view to leaving the film open-ended and allowing for possible sequels. Sarandon later expressed regret that this sequence seemed to make no sense in the context of the rest of the film: "The thing that made the film interesting to me was this question of, 'Would you want to live forever if you were an addict?' But as the film progressed, the powers that be rewrote the ending and decided that I wouldn't die, so what was the point? All the rules that we'd spent the entire film delineating, that Miriam lived forever and was indestructible, and all the people that she transformed [eventually] died, and that I killed myself rather than be an addict [were ignored]. Suddenly I was kind of living, she was kind of half dying... Nobody knew what was going on, and I thought that was a shame."

Bowie was excited to work on the film but was concerned about the final product. He said "I must say, there's nothing that looks like it on the market. But I'm a bit worried that it's just perversely bloody at some points."

Music 
Howard Blake was musical director on The Hunger. Although a soundtrack album accompanied the film's release (Varèse Sarabande VSD 47261), this issue omits much of the music used in the film.

Blake's noted on working with director Tony Scott, "Tony wanted to create a score largely using classical music and I researched this, many days going to his home in Wimbledon with stacks of recordings to play to him. One of these was the duet for two sopranos from Delibes' Lakmé, which I recorded specially with Elaine Barry and Judith Rees, conducting my orchestra The Sinfonia of London. Howard Shelley joined with Ralph Holmes and Raphael Wallfisch to record the second movement of Schubert's Piano Trio in E flat. Ralph recorded the Gigue from Bach's Violin Partita in E and Raphael the Prelude to Bach's solo cello sonata in G, to which Bowie mimed. I was persuaded to appear in one scene as a pianist, for which I wrote a 'Dolphin Square Blues'. Tony wanted to add a synthesizer score and I introduced him to Hans Zimmer, then working at The Snake Ranch Studio in Fulham but Tony eventually used a score by Michel Rubini and Denny Jaeger with electronics by David Lawson. It is hard however to exactly separate these elements."

Release 
The Hunger was nominated for two Saturn Awards for Best Costume and Best Make-up, while receiving mixed reviews upon its release, with criticism given towards its pacing and plot, while being heavy on atmosphere and visuals. Roger Ebert of the Chicago Sun-Times described the film as "an agonizingly bad vampire movie," remarking that the sex scene between Deneuve and Sarandon is effective, but that the film is so heavy on set design and scene cuts that any sense of a story is lost. In a brief review in Rolling Stone, Michael Sragow similarly called it "A minor horror movie with a major modern-movie problem: director Tony Scott develops so many ingenious ways to illustrate his premise that there's no time left to tell a story."

Christopher John reviewed The Hunger in Ares Magazine #15 and commented that "Beautifully filmed, but boringly void of substance, The Hunger is (was) a film to be avoided like the plague."

Camille Paglia wrote in Sexual Personae (1990) that while The Hunger comes close to being a masterpiece of a "classy genre of vampire film", it is "ruined by horrendous errors, as when the regal Catherine Deneuve is made to crawl around on all fours, slavering over cut throats", which Paglia considered an inappropriate focus on violence rather than sex. Critic Elaine Showalter called The Hunger a "post-modernist vampire film" that "casts vampirism in bisexual terms, drawing on the tradition of the lesbian vampire...Contemporary and stylish, [it] is also disquieting in its suggestion that men and women in the 1980s have the same desires, the same appetites, and the same needs for power, money, and sex." David Bowie later commented about the film that "the first twenty minutes rattle along like hell - it really is a great opening."

On the review aggregator website Rotten Tomatoes, The Hunger holds a 56% approval rating based on 36 reviews, with an average rating of 5.7/10. The consensus reads: "Stylish yet hollow, The Hunger is a well-cast vampire thriller that mistakes erotic moments for a satisfying story."

Legacy 
“Hollywood just hated that movie. They called it, “Esoteric, artsy-fartsy“ - Tony Scott
The film has been listed as a cult film. Later reviews have called the film "outrageously sleek" and "a cinematic work of art that has stood the test of time" that deserves "a new look." The film is popular with some segments of the Goth subculture and inspired a short-lived TV series of the same name, although the series has no direct plot or character connection to it.

The film has been cited by publisher Fred Berger as an influence on the creation and direction of his gothic subculture zine Propaganda, and by showrunner Bryan Fuller on his television series Hannibal.

Remake 
On 23 September 2009, Warner Bros. announced it planned a remake of the film, with the screenplay written by Whitley Strieber. 
Warner Bros, after years of silence, shared news about the remake in 2021 with a new screenplay by Jessica Sharzer and it being produced by Greg Berlanti, Sarah Schechter and Mike McGrath.

See also 
 The Celluloid Closet, a 1995 documentary film about lesbian, gay, bisexual, and transgender roles in film, in which Sarandon talks candidly about The Hunger lesbian seduction scene.

References

External links 
 
 
 
 

1983 films
1980s English-language films
1983 directorial debut films
1983 horror films
1983 LGBT-related films
American supernatural horror films
American LGBT-related films
British horror films
British vampire films
British LGBT-related films
Female bisexuality in film
Films based on American horror novels
Films based on works by Whitley Strieber
Films directed by Tony Scott
Films set in New York City
Films shot at Shepperton Studios
Films shot in London
Films shot in New York City
Goth subculture
Lesbian-related films
LGBT-related horror films
Metro-Goldwyn-Mayer films
American vampire films
1980s American films
1980s British films